Badistornis is a bird genus of the family Aramidae. Badistornis aramus is the only member of this genus. It is similar to the living species limpkin (Aramus guarauna) but larger. It was collected in Metamynodon zone river channel sandstone of South Dakota.

References

Gruiformes
Monotypic bird genera
Prehistoric birds of North America